The Cuckoos may refer to:

 The Cuckoos (1930 film), a U.S. musical comedy
 The Cuckoos (1949 film), a German comedy-drama